A tick mattress, bed tick or tick is a large bag made of strong, stiff, tightly-woven material (ticking). This is then filled to make a mattress, with material such as straw, chaff, horsehair, coarse wool or down feathers, and less commonly, leaves, grass, reeds, bracken, or seaweed. The whole stuffed mattress may also, more loosely, be called a tick. The tick mattress may then be sewn through to hold the filling in place, or the unsecured filling could be shaken and smoothed as the beds were aired each morning. A straw-filled bed tick is called a paillasse, palliasse, or pallet, and these terms may also be used for bed ticks with other fillings. A tick filled with flock (loose, unspun fibers, traditionally of cotton or wool) is called a flockbed. A feather-filled tick is called a featherbed, and a down-filled one a downbed; these can also be used above the sleeper, as a duvet. 

A tick mattress (or a pile of such tick mattresses, softest topmost, and the sheets, bedcovers, and pillows), was what Europeans traditionally called a "bed". The bedframe, when present, supported the bed, but was not considered part of it.

History

In the fifteenth century, most people in Europe slept on straw, but very rich people had featherbeds on top (for instance, Anne of Brittany's ladies in waiting slept on straw beds). By the nineteenth century many people had feather beds. 

If the pile of mattresses threatened to slide off the bed, in 16th- and 17th-century England it was restrained with bedstaves, vertical poles thrust into the frame. A broad step might be placed alongside the bed, as a place to sit and as a step up onto the pile of bedclothes.

Bedticks were often aired, often by hanging them outdoors, as bedding is still aired in parts of Europe and in East Asia. In English-speaking cultures, however, airing bedding outdoors came to be seen as a foreign practice, with 19th-century housekeeping manuals giving methods of airing beds inside, and disparaging airing them in the window as "German-style".

Stuffings

Straw and hay are cheap and abundant stuffings. The chaff of a local grain, be it rice chaff or oat chaff, is softer but less abundant. Reeds, bracken, seaweed, and esparto grass have also been used. Horsehair and flock make for firmer beds. Rags have also been used.

Before recycled cotton cloth was widely available in Japan, commoners slept upon , stitched crinkled paper stuffed with fibers from beaten dry straw, cattails, or silk waste, on top of  straw floor mats. Cotton was introduced from Korea in the 15th century, but did not become widely available throughout Japan until the mid-eighteenth; commoners continued to rely on wild and cultivated bast fibers. Later, futon ticks were made with patchwork recycled cotton, quilted together and filled with bast fiber. Later still, they were filled with cotton, mattresses and coverlets both. Wool and synthetics are now also used.

Leaves can be used to fill ticks; they vary in quality by species and time of year. Chestnut-leaves are prone to rustle, and were therefore called parliament-beds in 17th-century France. Beech leaves were a quieter stuffing; if harvested in autumn before they were "much frostbitten", stayed soft and loose and did not become musty for seven or eight years, far longer than straw. Beech-leaf beds were also said to smell of green tea and crackle slightly, and be as soft an elastic as maize-husk beds.

Swapping out the stuffing was often done seasonally, as materials became available. Travellers might carry ticks, but not the stuffing, buying whatever filling was cheap locally. 

For expensive fillings, like feathers, the feathers would outlast the tick, and be transferred into a new tick when they began to poke through old one. Featherbeds may be washed intact, or feathers and tick can be cleaned separately. Since featherbeds were historically very valuable, and the feathers often took years to collect, they were not simply discarded and replaced. Indeed, they were taken along by migrants and mentioned in wills. Featherbeds were often made with feathers saved from poultry plucked for eating (servants were often allowed to keep the feathers they plucked). Goose and duck feathers were most valued (chicken feathers were undesirable), and down was softer and more valuable than other feathers.

Tufting and quilting

To hold the filling in place, either sturdy individual securing stitches can be made through the tick and the filling (tufting), or the mattress can be quilted with lines of stitches. Both techniques are also used decoratively.

Individual tufting stitches for stronger materials and harder fillings are made with a stronger thread or twine. An extra-long upholstery needle may be needed to pass the thread through the tick easily. Sometimes the stitches are finished with buttons on each side (often covered buttons). 

Mattress quilting is done in a variety of patterns. Denser stitching makes the mattress firmer.

Unsewn ticking sheets

The lowest layer might be covered with a length of ticking instead of stuffed into a tick, which made it easier to change. Henry VII of England's bed had a lower layer of loose straw:

Such simple beds were also used as the only mattress

See also

 Futons, Japanese tick mattresses
 Ticking, cloth used to make ticks.

References

Bedding
Upholstery